Boduan is a village in Gwynedd, Wales, about 4 miles from Pwllheli. It is in the historic county of Caernarfonshire. It was due to host the National Eisteddfod in 2021 but this has been postponed to 2023.

Notable sites
Garn Boduan, a hillfort built soon after Roman occupation, is located in the village. Plas Boduan is an 18th century Grade II listed house, set in a park dating from the 19th century which is designated Grade II on the Cadw/ICOMOS Register of Parks and Gardens of Special Historic Interest in Wales.

References

External links 

www.geograph.co.uk : photos of Boduan and surrounding area

Villages in Gwynedd
Buan, Gwynedd
Registered historic parks and gardens in Gwynedd
Grade II listed buildings in Gwynedd